The United Armed Forces of the Commonwealth of Independent States was a short-lived military entity associated with the Commonwealth of Independent States. It was created in 1992 after the demise of the Soviet Union, and was intended to be the continuation of the Armed Forces of the Soviet Union and to hold control over the Soviet Union's nuclear weapons. 

It was rapidly superseded by the de facto Russian control of those nuclear weapons, and the formation of separate national armies for each of the former Soviet states, and had effectively ceased to exist by the end of 1993.

Formation 
The Soviet Union officially dissolved on 25 December 1991. After signing the Belavezha Accords on 21 December 1991, the countries of the newly formed CIS signed a protocol on the temporary appointment of Marshal of Aviation Yevgeny Shaposhnikov as Minister of Defence and commander of the armed forces in their territory, including strategic nuclear forces. On 14 February 1992 Shaposhnikov formally became Supreme Commander of the CIS Armed Forces.

Disintegration 
On 16 March 1992 a decree by Boris Yeltsin created the Armed Forces of the Russian Federation under the operational control of Allied High Command and the Ministry of Defence, which was headed by the President. Finally, on 7 May 1992, Yeltsin signed a decree establishing the Russian armed forces and Yeltsin assumed the duties of the Supreme Commander. In May 1992, General Colonel Pavel Grachev became the Russian Minister of Defence, and was made Russia's first Army General on assuming the post. 

After this announcement, Marshal of Aviation Yevgeny Shaposhnikov, Commander-in-Chief of CIS Armed Forces, Head of the Main Command (Glavkomat) "and a skeletal staff to support his role as commander of the CIS Armed Forces were evicted from the MoD and General Staff buildings and given offices in the former Warsaw Pact headquarters on the northern outskirts of Moscow" (on Prospekt Mira). Shaposhnikov's staff quickly became a very weak body as the new states' authorities asserted their control over their own armed forces. On 15 June 1993 Shaposhnikov's staff was abolished, and Shaposhnikov resigned. By the end of 1993 the abolition of the Joint Military Command (Glavkomat) had become effective.

The CIS Joint Military Command was replaced with a scaled-down Joint Staff for Coordinating Military Cooperation. An agreement was formally signed at Ashgabat on 24 December 1993 to establish the Staff for the Coordination of Military Cooperation Member States of the Commomwealth of Independent States (Russian: Штабе по координации военного сотрудничества
государств – участников Содружества Независимых Государств).
Colonel General Viktor Samsonov took up the role until October 1996. Army General Vladimir Yakovlev (general) appears to have become Chief of the Staff in June 2001.

See also 
 Collective Security Treaty Organization
 Joint CIS Air Defense System

References

External links 
 Commonwealth Defense Arrangements and International Security. Center for Naval Analyses, June 1992
 CSTO, History of Organizational Development and development of the Joint Staff of the Collective Security Treaty Organization

Dissolution of the Soviet Union
Military of the Commonwealth of Independent States
1992 establishments
1993 disestablishments